Harsh Vardhan may refer to:

Harsha, Indian emperor
Harsh Vardhan (Delhi politician) (born 1954), Indian politician who served as Union Minister for Health and Family Welfare
Harsh Vardhan (Uttar Pradesh politician) (1947–2016), Indian politician 
Harsha Vardhan (born 1974), Indian actor in Telugu films
Harshvardhan Kapoor (born 1990), Indian actor in Hindi films
Harsh Goenka (also known as Harsh Vardhan Goenka, born 1957), Indian industrialist
Harshvardhan Rane (born 1983), Indian actor in Telugu and Hindi films
Harsh Vardhan Shringla (born 1962), Indian diplomat
Harshabardhan, a fictional character created by Shibram Chakraborty

Hindu given names
Indian given names
Telugu names
Telugu given names